Csaba Bernáth (born 26 March 1979) in Debrecen is a Hungarian footballer who currently plays for Debreceni VSC.

Honours
Debreceni VSC
 Nemzeti Bajnokság I: 2005, 2006, 2007, 2009,2010, 2012
 Magyar Kupa: 1999, 2001, 2008, 2012
 Szuperkupa: 2005, 2006, 2007, 2009

External links 
Player profile at HLSZ 
Player profile at Nemzeti Sport 

1979 births
Living people
Sportspeople from Debrecen
Hungarian footballers
Association football defenders
KCFC-Hajdúszoboszló footballers
Royal Antwerp F.C. players
Debreceni VSC players
Nemzeti Bajnokság I players
Hungarian expatriate footballers
Expatriate footballers in Belgium
Hungarian expatriate sportspeople in Belgium